Pentostatin (or deoxycoformycin, trade name Nipent, manufactured by SuperGen) is an anticancer chemotherapeutic drug.

Mechanism
It is classified as a purine analog, which is a type of antimetabolite.

It mimics the nucleoside adenosine and thus inhibits the enzyme adenosine deaminase, interfering with the cell's ability to process DNA.

Cancer cells generally divide more often than healthy cells; DNA is highly involved in cell division (mitosis) and drugs which target DNA-related processes are therefore more toxic to cancer cells than healthy cells.

Uses
Pentostatin is used to treat hairy cell leukemia. It is given by intravenous infusion once every two weeks for three to six months.

Additionally, pentostatin has been used to treat steroid-refractory acute and chronic graft-versus-host disease.

Pentostatin is also used in chronic lymphocytic leukemia (CLL) patients who have relapsed.

References

Nucleosides
Purine antagonists
Adenosine deaminase inhibitors